Brass is a Local Government Area in Bayelsa State, southern Nigeria. Its headquarters are in the town of Twon-Brass on Brass Island along the coast, it has a coastline of approximately 90 km on the Bight of Bonny. Much of the area of the LGA is occupied by the Edumanom National Forest.

It has an area of 1,404 km and a population of 185,049 at the 2006 census.

The postal code of the area is 562.  It is a traditional fishing village of the Nembe branch of the Ijo people, it became a slave-trading port for the state of Brass (Nembe)  in the early 19th century. It was  ruled by African merchant “houses,” which were encouraged by the European traders, the state’s chief slave-collecting centres (Brass and Nembe) often sent war canoes into the interior—especially through Igbo country—to capture slaves.

Economy of Brass 

Brass  has enormous deposits of crude oil and natural gas and because of the rich natural resources has the presence of several national and international oil mining companies. The activities of these oil mining companies has contributed to  the most of the economic development of the Brass area. The Brass people are also known as farmers as  Farming is also an important economic activity  with crops such as oil palm, plantain, and sugarcane grown in the Brass area. Another economy activities of the Brass to sustain livelihood are Fishing and  the making of fishing nets, construction of canoes also is another key economic features of the Brass area.

Notable people
 

Kingsley Akpososo (born 1990), footballer

References

Local Government Areas in Bayelsa State
Populated coastal places in Nigeria